The 1964–65 NCAA University Division men's basketball season began in December 1964, progressed through the regular season and conference tournaments, and concluded with the 1965 NCAA University Division basketball tournament championship game on March 20, 1965, at Memorial Coliseum in Portland, Oregon. The UCLA Bruins won their second NCAA national championship with a 91–80 victory over the Michigan Wolverines.

Season headlines 
 The Associated Press (AP) Poll introduced a preseason Top 20, but during the season continued to rank only the Top 10 teams, as it had done since the 1961–62 season.
 The NCAA tournament contracted from 25 to 23 teams.
 The National Invitation Tournament expanded from 12 to 14 teams.
 UCLA won its second consecutive national championship, as well as its second overall.

Season outlook

Pre-season polls 

The Top 20 from the AP Poll and the UPI Coaches Poll during the pre-season.

Conference membership changes

Regular season

Conference winners and tournaments

Informal championships

Statistical leaders

Post-season tournaments

NCAA tournament

Final Four 

 Third Place – Princeton 118, Wichita State 82

National Invitation tournament

Semifinals & finals 

 Third Place – Army 75, NYU 74

Awards

Consensus All-American teams

Major player of the year awards 

 Helms Player of the Year: Bill Bradley, Princeton, & Gail Goodrich, UCLA
 Associated Press Player of the Year: Bill Bradley, Princeton
 UPI Player of the Year: Bill Bradley, Princeton
 Oscar Robertson Trophy (USBWA): Bill Bradley, Princeton
 Sporting News Player of the Year: Bill Bradley, Princeton

Major coach of the year awards 

 Henry Iba Award: Butch van Breda Kolff, Princeton
 NABC Coach of the Year: Butch van Breda Kolff, Princeton
 UPI Coach of the Year: Dave Strack, Michigan
 Sporting News Coach of the Year: No award

Other major awards 

 Robert V. Geasey Trophy (Top player in Philadelphia Big 5): Jim Washington, Villanova
 NIT/Haggerty Award (Top player in New York City metro area): Warren Isaac, Iona

Coaching changes 

A number of teams changed coaches during the season and after it ended.

References